Wies van Dongen (30 July 1931 – 25 May 2022) was a Dutch professional racing cyclist. He rode in two editions of the Tour de France, retiring both in 1955 and 1956.

References

External links
 

1931 births
2022 deaths
Dutch male cyclists
Sportspeople from Breda
Cyclists from North Brabant